Lermontovo is a residential area in Tsentralny District of Kaliningrad, Russia. It was formerly known by its German language name Charlottenburg as first a suburban estate and then a quarter of northwestern Königsberg, Germany.

History

Charlottenburg was located northwest of Hufen and Hardershof, west of Ballieth, and southeast of Tannenwalde. Sophia Charlotte was the queen-consort of Frederick I, the first King in Prussia. Molded bricks for the construction of the University of Königsberg's new campus came from a pottery factory near Charlottenburg. It developed into a residential garden town suburb of Königsberg in the first half of the 20th century. Charlottenburg was incorporated into the city of Königsberg in 1939.

Königsberg was transferred to Soviet control in 1945 after World War II. Königsberg was subsequently renamed to Kaliningrad and Charlottenburg to Lermontovo after Mikhail Lermontov.

Notes

References

Kaliningrad